Elizabeth Mair (born June 9, 1978) is an American political and communications consultant. She has worked as a journalist and commentator. She was the Online Communications Director at the 2008 Republican National Committee and has been a political strategist for a number of Republicans. 

She was named one of Campaigns & Elections' Influencers 50 in the field of communications in 2013. In December 2015, Mair founded the anti-Trump Make America Awesome Super PAC for Wisconsin Gov. Scott Walker's presidential campaign. She received criticism and resigned from one position due to a few Twitter messages that she had sent.

Personal life and education

Elizabeth A. Mair, who goes by Liz, was born and grew up in Seattle, Washington and lived in the United Kingdom for ten years. 

She received a M.A. in International Studies at the University of St Andrews in Scotland, and a Certificate in Political and Social Sciences in International Studies from the Institut d'Etudes Politiques de Paris. She obtained her law degree from the College of Law London. She was based in Arlington, Virginia from 2006 and then moved to Connecticut.

Career

Corporate and legal
She was a corporate lawyer, specializing in private equity and debt finance, at Macfarlanes LLP in London. Mair practiced law in London for three years. She has been vice president for Hynes Communications by 2011, where she advised clients on political and communications strategy. She joined the GOProud advisory council in 2011.

Journalist and commentator
Mair writes for various publications, including The Daily Beast, the Washington Examiner, The Hill, and Reason magazine, and previously wrote for U.S. News & World Report.

Mair frequently appears as a commentator on television, including Fox News, MSNBC, CNN and Real Time with Bill Maher. She is also a UK broadcaster and ITN's regular GOP contributor during its presidential election night coverage.

Politics 

Mair served as Online Communications Director at the 2008 Republican National Committee. She served as a spokesperson for the John McCain campaign and the RNC.

Since the RNC, Mair has worked for U.S. politicians including Rand Paul, Scott Walker, Rick Perry, Carly Fiorina, and Roy Blunt. In 2013, Mair was named one of Campaigns & Elections' Influencers 50 in the field of communications in 2013. By 2013, she established her communications and public relations consulting business. Her clients have included politicians, Fortune 500 companies, and lobbyists. In December 2015, Mair established the anti-Trump Make America Awesome Super PAC for Wisconsin Gov. Scott Walker's presidential campaign. It was created in opposition to Trump running for president and it focused on Florida, Indiana, Maryland and New Hampshire.

In 2015, 48 hours after being announced Walker's aide for his presidential campaign preparation, Mair resigned after it was reported that she had posted Twitter messages critical of agricultural subsidies, ethanol mandates, and "Iowa's front-running status" in the US election cycle. In March 2019, Mair was accused in a defamation lawsuit brought by US Congressman Devin Nunes as being behind the @DevinCow parody Twitter account. In June 2020, a judge from Virginia ruled that social media networks are not liable for the posts made by their users, in accordance with Section 230 of the federal Communications Decency Act. In August 2021, the same judge dismissed the second of two suits Nunes had filed against Mair.

References

1978 births
Living people
American political consultants
Alumni of the University of St Andrews
Sciences Po alumni
People from Seattle
Washington, D.C., Republicans